Mieczysław Łęczycki (born 1897, date of death unknown) was a Polish architect. His work was part of the architecture event in the art competition at the 1928 Summer Olympics.

References

1897 births
Year of death missing
20th-century Polish architects
Olympic competitors in art competitions
Architects from Łódź